FabricLive.75 is a DJ mix album by English DJ duo Elijah & Skilliam. The album was released as part of the FabricLive Mix Series.

Track listing

References

External links

FabricLive.75 at Fabric

Fabric (club) albums
2014 compilation albums